Leo P. O'Brien (July 20, 1893 – March 25, 1968) was a member of the Wisconsin State Senate from the 2nd District.

Biography
O'Brien was born on July 20, 1893, in Fond du Lac, Wisconsin. He attended the University of Wisconsin-Madison, Marquette University and St. Norbert College. During World War I and World War II, he served with the United States Navy. He died in 1968 of a heart attack.

Political career
O'Brien was a member of the Senate from 1953 to 1964. He was a Republican.

References

1893 births
1968 deaths
Politicians from Fond du Lac, Wisconsin
Republican Party Wisconsin state senators
Military personnel from Wisconsin
United States Navy personnel of World War I
United States Navy personnel of World War II
United States Navy sailors
University of Wisconsin–Madison alumni
Marquette University alumni
St. Norbert College alumni
20th-century American politicians